Cody Thane Vasut (born August 13, 1987) is an American politician. He has represented the 25th District in the Texas House of Representatives since 2021. A member of the Republican Party, Vasut also works as an attorney.

Early life, education, and career
Born in Houston to John and Pella Vasut. Vasut grew up in Brazoria County, Texas, where he then graduated from Angleton High School. He then went on to attend Texas A&M University, where he received a BBA and a MS in Management. During college at Texas A&M, he became the 37th speaker of the student senate. Vasut later earned his Juris Doctor from the University of Houston Law Center in 2012. From 2012 to 2020, he worked as an associate attorney for BakerHostetler in Houston, along with being a council member for the city of Angleton. Vasut served as councilmember from May 2016 to May 2020. During his time as councilmember, He voted to lower the property tax rate to the city to its lowest in decades, he also brought prayer into the meetings.

Election
Vasut filed in 2019 to run for the Texas House of Representatives District 25 seat, that was being held by Dennis Bonnen at the time. Representative Bonnen announced in late 2019, that he would not seek re-election for the 87th legislature. Vasut won the 2020 election for the seat against Democrat Patrick Henry with 71% of the vote in November 2020. Governor Greg Abbott had endorsed Vasut prior to the election.

Vasut supports a ban on Democrats being given committee chairmanships as long as the Republicans hold the majority of seats in the Texas House.

References

External links
 Campaign website
 State legislative page

1987 births
Living people
21st-century American lawyers
21st-century American politicians
Republican Party members of the Texas House of Representatives
People associated with BakerHostetler
People from Angleton, Texas
Texas A&M University alumni
Texas lawyers
University of Houston Law Center alumni